Sixth Street Bridge may refer to:
Sixth Street Viaduct, bridge in Los Angeles
Sixth Street Bridge (Pittsburgh, Pennsylvania)
Sixth Street Bridge (Grand Rapids, Michigan)
Sixth Street Railroad Bridge, between Parkersburg, West Virginia, and Belpre, Ohio
West Sixth Street Bridge in Austin, Texas